Alexander Murray Macbeath (30 June 1923 Glasgow – 14 May 2014 Warwick) was a mathematician who worked on Riemann surfaces. Macbeath surfaces and Macbeath regions are named after him.

Early life and education 
Macbeath was the son of Alexander Macbeath, a philosopher and logician who took a position at Queen's University Belfast in 1925, soon after Murray was born. Murray also studied at Queen's University, where he earned a B.A. with honours.

During World War II, he worked in Hut 7 of the Government Code and Cypher School at Bletchley Park, breaking ciphers used for military communications by the Japanese navy and, later, army.

After the war he earned an M.A. (again with honours) from Clare College, Cambridge.
With a Commonwealth Fund fellowship, he then attended Princeton University, where he earned his Ph.D. in 1950 under the supervision of Emil Artin.

Career 
He taught at Keele University and the University of Dundee before moving to the University of Birmingham in 1963 where he stayed until 1979 as Mason Professor, then moved back to the University of Pittsburgh in the United States until he reached their statutory retirement age of 60.

He subsequently took up a position at the University of Dundee where he remained for a number of years, before moving to Warwickshire where at the University of Warwick he held the position of Emeritus Professor of Mathematics.

Death 
Professor Macbeath died on 14 May 2014 in Warwick, England.

References

Scottish mathematicians
Scientists from Glasgow
1923 births
2014 deaths